Datuk Mohid Mohamed is the Chief Secretary for the Ministry of Youth and Sport. Previously, he was the Deputy Commissioner of Sports in the same ministry. Datuk Mohid is active in many non-governmental organization especially societies that caters youth development and sport activities.

Personal life
Mohid Mohamed was born in Batu Pahat, Johor, Malaysia (19 September 1957).

Education
After completing his secondary education in the late 70's Mohid Mohamed went to University Malaya  and graduated with a Bachelor of Administration (Hons) and a Diploma in Education. He later went to obtain his Diploma of Public Administration from INTAN in Kuala Lumpur.

Knighthood
For his valor and contribution in the field of sports and youth development, Mohid Mohamed was awarded the title Dato' (Darjah Paduka Tuanku Jaafar DPTJ) from His Majesty His Majesty the Sultan of Negeri Sembilan. The title Dato' is equivalent to the title Sir given by the British.

Board members and association
He is currently the board member for Sepang International Circuit (SIC), Stadium Merdeka Council and many other association.

References

Malaysian people of Malay descent
Living people
1959 births